Tinadysderina is a genus of spiders in the family Oonopidae. It was first described in 2013 by Platnick, Berniker & Bonaldo. , it contains 6 species from Colombia and Ecuador.

Species
Tinadysderina comprises the following species:
Tinadysderina bremen Platnick, Berniker & Bonaldo, 2013
Tinadysderina gorgona Platnick, Berniker & Bonaldo, 2013
Tinadysderina otonga Platnick, Berniker & Bonaldo, 2013
Tinadysderina pereira Platnick, Berniker & Bonaldo, 2013
Tinadysderina planada Platnick, Berniker & Bonaldo, 2013
Tinadysderina tinalandia Platnick, Berniker & Bonaldo, 2013

References

Oonopidae
Araneomorphae genera
Spiders of South America